A Long Time Coming is the debut studio album by Emmy award-winning actor and comedian, Wayne Brady. It was released on September 16, 2008. It spawned one single, "Ordinary". It peaked at #183 on the Billboard 200 and #30 on the Top R&B/Hip-Hop Albums chart on October 4, 2008, but five weeks later, it went up on the Top R&B/Hip-Hop Albums, peaking at #20 and making a re-entry on the Billboard 200 at #157.

Track listing

Chart positions

References

External links
A Long Time Coming iTunes Booklet at Concord Music Group

2008 debut albums
Wayne Brady albums
Concord Music Group albums
Peak Records albums